Emmett Taylor (born January 26, 1947) is an American former sprinter.

References

1947 births
Living people
American male sprinters
Place of birth missing (living people)
Pan American Games gold medalists for the United States
Athletes (track and field) at the 1967 Pan American Games
Pan American Games medalists in athletics (track and field)
Medalists at the 1967 Pan American Games